Semaphorin-3F is a protein that in humans is encoded by the SEMA3F gene.

The semaphorins are a family of proteins that are involved in signaling. All the family members have a secretion signal, a 500-amino acid sema domain, and 16 conserved cysteine residues (Kolodkin et al., 1993). Sequence comparisons have grouped the secreted semaphorins into 3 general classes (classes 2, 3 and V), all of which also have an immunoglobulin domain. The semaphorin 3 family, consisting of human semaphorins 3A-G (SEMA3A; MIM 603961), chicken collapsin, and mouse semaphorins 3A-G, all have a basic domain at the C terminus. Chicken collapsin contributes to path finding by axons during development by inhibiting extension of growth cones (Luo et al., 1993) through an interaction with a collapsin response mediator protein of relative molecular mass 62K (CRMP62) (Goshima et al., 1995), a putative homolog of an axonal guidance associated UNC33 gene product (MIM 601168). SEMA3F is a secreted member of the semaphorin III family.[supplied by OMIM]

References

Further reading